Orbital-D1, also known as Orb-D1, and Cygnus 1, was the first flight of the Cygnus cargo spacecraft developed by Orbital Sciences Corporation. It was named after the late NASA astronaut and Orbital Sciences executive G. David Low. The flight was carried out by Orbital Sciences under contract to NASA as Cygnus' demonstration mission in the Commercial Orbital Transportation Services (COTS) program. The mission launched on 18 September 2013 at 14:58:02 UTC. Cygnus was the seventh type of spacecraft to visit the International Space Station (ISS), after the crewed Soyuz and Space Shuttle, and uncrewed Progress, ATV, HTV and Dragon 1.

Spacecraft 

The Cygnus Orb-D1 mission was the first flight of the Cygnus spacecraft and used the standard configuration with a Pressurized Cargo Module (PCM), built by Thales Alenia Space, in Italy.

Orbital named this mission's Cygnus spacecraft the G. David Low after the former NASA astronaut and Orbital employee who died of cancer on 15 March 2008. During a media briefing for the Cygnus Orb-1 mission, Orbital Sciences executive vice president Frank Culbertson stated, "We were very proud to name that  the G. David Low".

Launch and early operations 
Cygnus Orb-D1 was launched by an Antares 110 launch vehicle flying from Pad 0A at the Mid-Atlantic Regional Spaceport (MARS). The launch took place at 14:58:02 UTC on 18 September 2013, and successfully inserted the Cygnus into low Earth orbit. The launch marked the second flight of the Antares launch vehicle and the final flight of the interim Antares 110 configuration.

ISS rendezvous 
Rendezvous with the ISS was originally scheduled for the fourth day of the mission. However, the rendezvous was postponed due to a computer data link problem. The exact error related to small discrepancies between the way the ISS and Cygnus each use GPS for timekeeping purposes. A further delay was necessary to allow for the arrival of Soyuz TMA-10M with three new ISS crew members.

A week late, the spacecraft conducted a series of navigation, control and safety tests as it approached the station. Then, Italian astronaut Luca Parmitano grappled it at 11:00 UTC, on 29 September 2013, using the Canadarm2 Mobile Servicing System (MSS)  as the two spacecraft sailed high above the Indian Ocean. Cygnus was berthed to the nadir port of the station's Harmony node.

Payload 
Cygnus Orb-D1 carried  of cargo to the ISS, including food and spare parts.

End of mission 
On 22 October 2013, the Canadarm2 was used to unberth the Cygnus spacecraft from the nadir port of the Harmony module at 10:04 UTC. The spacecraft was then maneuvered to a release position below the station, where it was released from the RMS at 11:31 UTC. It then performed a series of separation maneuvers away from the station. The spacecraft fired its main engine to de-orbit itself on 23 October 2013 at 17:41 UTC, with reentry and burning up in the atmosphere over the southern Pacific Ocean occurring at 18:16 UTC.

Gallery

References

External links 

 Orb-D1 mission page at Orbital.com
 Orb-D1 mission page at Spaceflight Now
 Video of the launch of Orb-D1
 Video of Cygnus being berthed to the ISS
 Video of the hatch to Cygnus being opened
 Video of the hatch to Cygnus being closed
 Video of Cygnus departing from the ISS

Cygnus (spacecraft)
Spacecraft launched by Antares rockets
Spacecraft launched in 2013
Spacecraft which reentered in 2013
Supply vehicles for the International Space Station